Niwar may refer to

 Niwar town in Madhya Pradesh
 Niwar (cotton tape), a thick tape.